Royal Hawaiian may refer to:

Royal Hawaiian Hotel, Honolulu
Royal Hawaiian Center, a retail complex in Waikiki
Royal Hawaiian Band, the oldest and only full-time municipal band in the United States

See also
Ali'i, the hereditary highest class of Hawaiian society